Suryapura is a village development committee in Rupandehi District in Lumbini Province of southern Nepal. At the time of the 1991 Nepal census it had a population of 13,701.

At the time 2011 A.D total population of  suryapura V.D.C was 20,773 and Male=10,396 and 
Female = 10,377 and total household was 3,212 .
Source of Central Bureau of Statistics kathmandu , government of Nepal .
there are many religion follow people  like hindu muslim christian . many people engages in agriculture but some people engages in government job like teachers , official job .

Available services

3G Network of Ncell and Nepal Telecom
Electricity ,
Wide road, 
Schools college ,
Health post ,
Police station ,
Post office and 
private Bank .

References

 Source of Central Bureau of Statistics kathmandu , government of Nepal

Populated places in Rupandehi District